Fast Track: No Limits is a 2008 independent film directed by Axel Sand and written and produced by Lee Goldberg. It was a co-production between Action Concept  and the German television network ProSiebenSat.1 The film stars Erin Cahill and Andrew Walker.

The film was shot in English, with American, British, Canadian, French, and German actors, on location in Berlin, Germany. Cars for the film were supplied by BMW, Audi, and Subaru. It aired first on ProSiebenSat.1 in February 2008, and was released theatrically in China by Beijing Time Entertainment. The film has been broadcast on television and released on DVD in dozens of countries, and it was released on DVD in the United States by Maverick Entertainment Group.

The screenplay was novelized by Lee Goldberg in 2013  though the setting was moved to the United States for the book.

Plot
For four young people; Katie, Mike, Eric, Nicole; speed is a way of life. But the four soon come to realize that living life in the fast lane carries a very high price. On the streets debts are not settled with cash, they are settled in blood. Each character has a different motive and a different goal but when they get behind the wheel they are all the same. It is the speed that connects them, but the one thing they all have in common will be the one thing that tears them apart.

The film starts with a bank giving Katie, owner of Carl's Garage warning about the debt on her garage. They then order pizza for lunch which is to be delivered by Mike, a pizza delivery man. On his way to delivery his way is blocked by Nicole's broken down car and then by a police chase between Eric, a police officer and Wolf, the bank robber's wheel man making him run out of time to deliver pizzas.

On the road, Katie's Subaru is driven by a mysterious Phantom driver in the illegal racing events, earning her extra money for paying her debts. Meanwhile, in garage Mike sees Nicole's BMW which he steals to prove he is a good racer to Katie by participating and winning in illegal racing. There he races against Wolf and ultimately wins the race but wrecks the BMW.

Next day when Nicole sees what has become of her husband's car, Mike apologizes saying that a car can be fixed but one can't buy what it feels like after winning. This earns Katie Nicole's contract for building her a luxury sports car. Meanwhile, Mike is hired by Gargolov, a crime lord as a wheel man in place of Wolf.

Eric is investigating the bank robberies and discovers that Wolf is the former wheel man of Gargolov and also learns that Mike is the new one. He investigates Mike's background and learns that he is a wanted convict.

As ordered, Nicole's new sports car is made by Katie on which Mike teaches her how to race, drive and drift.

After serving as a getaway driver for Gargolov, botching the mission in the process, Mike is confronted by Eric. After an explanation of how Mike got involved and being convinced to race for Katie's sake, Mike and Eric become allies and duel against Wolf for the last time. Wolf's car crashes at the end of the race, killing him. Mike later declares his resignation to Gargolov; all four of the main characters reunite at Carl's Garage, from where they all take a drive together.

Cast
Erin Cahill as Katie Reed
Andrew Walker as Mike Bender Cassidy
Joseph Beattie as Eric Marc Visnjic
Alexia Barlier as Nicole Devereaux
Nicholas Aaron as Wolverine
Pasquale Aleardi as Gregor Gargolov
Maurice Roëves as Schmitty
Jack Bence as Rainer
Tim Dantay as Neubeck
Ill-Young Kim as Markus
Shaun Prendergast as Heinrich
Carl Stück as Porsche Thief
Anna Tkatschenko as Race Diver

References

External links

Film Intuition Review
Variety Article on Making of Fast Track
Quotenmeter review
Interview with Lee Goldberg

2008 films
English-language German films
Films shot in Berlin
2000s chase films
German auto racing films
Films set in Germany
2008 action thriller films
German action thriller films
2000s English-language films
2000s German films